dom4j is an open-source Java library for working with XML, XPath and XSLT. It is compatible with DOM, SAX and JAXP standards.

The library is distributed under an BSD-style license.

Versions
The stable version of dom4j for Java 1.4, 1.6.1, was released on May 16, 2005.
The stable version of dom4j for Java 1.5, 2.0.3, was released on April 11, 2020.
The latest stable version of dom4j, 2.1.3, was released on April 12, 2020.

References

External links
Official website
Source and Binary files

Java (programming language) libraries
Software using the BSD license